Red Pheasant 108 is an Indian reserve of the Red Pheasant Cree Nation in Saskatchewan. It is 33 kilometres south of North Battleford. In the 2016 Canadian Census, it recorded a population of 519 living in 136 of its 163 total private dwellings. In the same year, its Community Well-Being index was calculated at 46 of 100, compared to 58.4 for the average First Nations community and 77.5 for the average non-Indigenous community.

References

Indian reserves in Saskatchewan
Division No. 12, Saskatchewan